Kastania may refer to:

 Kastania, Ioannina, Greece
 Kastania, Laconia, Greece
 Kastania, Pieria, Greece
 Kastania, Trikala, Greece
 Kastania, Kozani, Greece
 Kastania Cave
 Siege of Kastania, fought in July 1780
 Kastania, a mountain of Arcadia, the ancient Cnacalus
 Kastania, a village of Koumanis in Elis, Greece